The Fevers is a Brazilian rock band formed in the city of Rio de Janeiro in 1964. Part of a movement known as Jovem Guarda, they were formerly known as The Fenders when they were formed. The original line up was: Almir Ferreira Bezerra (vocals), Liebert Ferreira Pinto (bass), Lécio do Nascimento (drums), Pedrinho (guitar), Cleudir Teles Borges (keyboards), and Jimmy Cruise (vocals). The name was changed to The Fevers after Cruise left the band.

Discography 
 Vamos Dançar o Let Kiss (1965)
 A Juventude Manda vol. I (1966)
 A Juventude Manda vol. II (1967)
 The Fevers vol. III (1968)
 Os Reis do Baile (1969)
 O Máximo em Festa (1969)
 Fevers (1970)
 Explosão musical dos Fevers (1971, London Records)
 Fevers (1972)
 Fevers (1973)
 Fevers (1974)
 O Sol Nasce Para Todos (1975)
 Fevers (1976)
 Fevers (1977)
 Fevers (1978)
 Disco Club (1979, EMI)
 Fevers (1980)
 Fevers (1981)
 Fevers (1982)
 Fevers (1983)
 A Maior Festa do Mundo (1983, EMI)
 Fevers (1984)
 Fevers (1985)
 Fevers (1986)
 Fevers (1987)
 Fevers (1988)
 Fevers (1989)
 Fevers (1991)
 Agora é Pra Valer (1992)
 A Gente era Feliz e Não Sabia (1995, Som Livre)
 Vem Dançar (1998)
 Ao Vivo (1999, Sony BMG)
 Fevers (2004)
 Ao Vivo (2007) - CD e DVD

References

 [ Biography of the band] at allmusic

Brazilian rock music groups
Jovem Guarda
Musical groups established in 1964
Musical groups from Rio de Janeiro (city)
1964 establishments in Brazil